Naguib el-Rihani (January 21, 1889 in Cairo – June 8, 1949 in Alexandria) was an Egyptian film and stage actor.

Biography
Born in Bab El Shereya, Cairo to a middle class family. His father, a Christian who worked as a horse expert and a trader, his mother was a Coptic Egyptian woman from Cairo. He was one of three sons that his parents would have together. He was educated in the French Catholic school "Les Frères" in Cairo.

El-Rihani had a turbulent marriage with Badia Masabni, an actress and businesswoman who settled in Cairo after living within the United States for years, and established her famous cabaret, "Casino Badia." They separated before his death. He died at the age of 60 years in Cairo of typhus, while filming his last film, "Ghazal Al Banat".

He established his own theatrical group in the late 1910s, in Cairo, and partnered with his lifelong friend, Badeih Khairy, in adapting several French theatre hits to the Egyptian stage, and later to the cinema.

A great comedian both on stage and in films, he is considered "The Father of Comedy" in Egypt. Fuad Al Mohandes, the great Egyptian comedian of modern times, acknowledged Naguib Al Rihani's effect on him and his style in acting.

On 21 January 2016, Google Doodle commemorated his 127th birthday.

List of plays 
 Taaleeli Ya Bata (تعاليلي يابطة و انا مالي ايه)
 El Rial 1917.
 Kesh Kesh Bey Fee Paris. (Kesh Kesh Bey In Paris) 
 Hamar We Halawa.
 Ala Keifak (As You Like)
 El Ashra El Tayeba 1920, music by Sayed Darwish.
 Ayam El Ezz (Times of Prosperity).
 Lawe Kont Malik (If I Was A King).
 Mamlaket El Hob. (Kingdom of Love) 
 El Guineh El Masry (Egyptian Pound) 1931, adapted from Topaze by Marcel Pagnol
 El Donia Lama Tedhak (When Luck Smiles) 1934.
 Hokm Karakosh (Rule of Karakosh) 1936.
 Kismiti (My Luck) 1936.
 Lawe Kont Heleiwa (If I Was Handsome) 1938.
 El Dalouah (The Spoiled Girl) 1939.
 30 Yom Fee El Segn (30 Days In Prison)
 El Setat Ma Yearfoush Yekdebo (Women Never Lie)
 Ela Khamsa إلا خمسة (Minus Five) 1943.
 Hassan, Morcos & Cohen 1945.

Filmography 
 Saheb Al Saada KeshKesh Beh 1931.
 Yacout 1934, adapted from "El Guineh El Masry".
 Besalamtoh Ayez Yetgawwez 1936.
 Salamah Fe Kheer 1937.
 Abou Halmoos 1941.
 Leabet Al Set 1941.
 Si Omar 1941, adapted from "Lawe Kont Heleiwa".
 Ahmar Shafayef
 Ghazal Al Banat 1949.

References

External links 
 

1889 births
1949 deaths
Egyptian comedians
Egyptian male film actors
Egyptian male stage actors
Egyptian people of Coptic descent
20th-century comedians
Assyrian Egyptian
Egyptian Christians